Alderdale is an extinct town in Klickitat County, in the U.S. state of Washington. The GNIS classifies it as a populated place.

A post office called Alderdale was established in 1907, and remained in operation until 1962. In 1917 it was reported as a station on the Spokane, Portland and Seattle Railway. The community took its name from nearby Alder Creek.

References

Ghost towns in Washington (state)
Geography of Klickitat County, Washington